This is a list of films produced in Pakistan during 1980 (see 1980 in film) which use the Urdu language:

1980

See also
1980 in Pakistan

External links
 Search Pakistani film - IMDB.com

1980
Pakistani
Films